Heritage film is a critical term as opposed to a film genre label used by the film industry or filmmakers themselves. It initially referred to a cluster or cycle of late 20th-century British films that were argued to depict the United Kingdom of the pre-World War II decades in a nostalgic fashion. However, this original polemic use has broadened out, and the term is now also used more loosely to refer to period films with high-quality visual production values, including those produced in France, other European countries and beyond.

Many – but not all – 'heritage films' were adapted from classic literature of the 19th and early 20th centuries. For its critics on the political Left, however, the 'heritage film' was defined more centrally by: 
 A particular aesthetic approach (the 'heritage' or 'museum' aesthetic), marked by scrupulous attention to period detail and the use of splendid scenes of the English landscape, which was argued to have conservative ideological effects.
 A perceived relationship to the rise since the 1970s of the heritage industry and the discovery of 'heritage' (stately homes, etc.) as a marketable commodity.     
 The official promotion of a politically conservative, pro–free enterprise and upper-class-biased notion of the British heritage by successive 1980s British Conservative Governments under the Premiership of Margaret Thatcher.

At a time of British industrial decline, stagnant economic growth, political polarisation and social unrest, heritage films were appealing to many because they projected a nostalgic image of Britain as a prosperous, powerful and socially cohesive nation. Many cinematic and televised films focused on the British Empire, particularly the British Raj in India. However, while these films glorify and romanticize, they also provide a critique of the oppressive restrictions of British society and the superiority, arrogance, and controlled manner of the ruling classes. Maurice (1987) and Another Country (1984) were concerned with sexual repression and the intolerance of English society in the early 20th century, while Heat and Dust (1983) and A Passage to India (1984) criticized the ignorance of British authorities in India and the inequities of colonialism. Other critics point out that the representations, themes and perspectives presented in 'heritage films' are varied, not homogeneous, and many of them are romance narratives, suggesting that the pleasures they offer to audiences are more diverse – and less necessarily 'conservative' – than those assumed by their original critics.

Criticism
The 'heritage film' has been criticised from a socialist perspective for its romanticised portrayal of the past, its emphasis on the bourgeoisie or aristocracy rather than working class, and its fascination with luxurious settings, clothing, and lifestyles. Its critics argued that the films reduced the past to a lavish consumer experience, presenting it as spectacle rather than offering audiences historical or critical understanding. This argument was strongly coloured by the wider, politicised and polarised, debates around British film, culture and society taking place in the Thatcher era, including similar critiques of the heritage industry itself, vehement opposition to Thatcherism among many British filmmakers and other prominent cultural figures, and counter-attacks on ‘anti-Thatcher’ films (almost always, by contrast, set in present-day Britain) by Thatcher’s supporters in the British media.

A further important strand in the critical debate around 'heritage films' argues – from a feminist and pro-LGBT position – that, in contrast with their 'conservative' reputation, many of the films are strongly progressive in their gender and sexual politics. Many of the best-loved 'heritage films' focus on strong and complex female characters (more than many other popular film genres), and some focus directly on the personal struggles, social position, rights of women and LGBT individuals in ways that remain relevant and deeply moving to their contemporary audiences. In short, although the 'heritage film' became popular by providing an escape from the present – particularly in the divided social and political climate of 1980s Britain – the full picture of the films' appeal, politics, and personal value for their audiences is more complex.

Not all British films made since 1980 and set in the historic past are 'heritage films'. The 'heritage film' can be distinguished from period films that take a more self-conscious, less naturalistic, even anachronistic approach to screening narratives set in the past (the 'post-heritage film'); and from those set in more recent decades (usually 1940s onwards) that focus on characters from ordinary or working class social backgrounds, biographical subjects (biopics) and/or popular culture (the 'retro film' or 'alternative heritage film').

Cinema
 Chariots of Fire (1981)
 Another Country (1984)
 A Passage to India (1985)
 A Room with a View (1985)
 Maurice (1987)
 Little Dorrit (1987)
 A Handful of Dust (1988)
 Where Angels Fear to Tread (1991)
 Howards End (1992)
 Indochine (1992)
 Shadowlands (1993)
 The Remains of the Day (1993)
 The Madness of King George (1994)
 Sense and Sensibility (1995)
 Emma (1996)
 Shakespeare in Love (1998)
 Pride & Prejudice (2005) 
 The King's Speech (2010)

Literature
 Pamela Church Gibson, ‘From Dancing Queen to Plaster Virgin: Elizabeth and the End of English Heritage?’, Journal of Popular British Cinema, no. 5, 2002.
 Cairns Craig, ‘Rooms without a View’, Sight & Sound, June 1991, and in Ginette Vincendeau (Ed.) Film/Literature/Heritage, 2001.
 Richard Dyer, ‘Heritage Cinema in Europe’ in Ginette Vincendeau (Ed.) Encyclopedia of European Cinema, 1995.
 Robert Hewison, The Heritage Industry: Britain in a Climate of Decline, 1987.
 Andrew Higson, ‘Re-Presenting the National Past: Nostalgia and Pastiche in the Heritage Film’, in Lester Friedman (Ed.) British Cinema and Thatcherism, 1993.
 Andrew Higson, English Heritage, English Cinema: Costume Drama Since 1980, 2003.
 Andrew Higson, Film England: Culturally English Filmmaking since the 1990s, 2011.
 Lucia Krämer, "Oscar Wilde as an Object of the English Heritage Industry", Irish Studies Review, 13, 2005, 359-67.
 Claire Monk, ‘Sexuality and heritage’, Sight & Sound, October 1995, and in Ginette Vincendeau (Ed.) Film/Literature/Heritage, 2001.
 Claire Monk, ‘The British heritage-film debate revisited’ in Claire Monk and Amy Sargeant (Eds) British Historical Cinema: The History, Heritage and Costume Film, 2002.
 Claire Monk, Heritage Film Audiences: Period Film and Contemporary Audiences in the UK, 2011.
 Claire Monk, ‘Heritage Film Audiences 2.0: Period Film Audiences and Online Fan Cultures’, Participations: Journal of Audience and Reception Studies, 8:2, 2011.
 Julianne Pidduck, Contemporary Costume Film: Space, Place and the Past, 2004.
 Phil Powrie, ‘On the Threshold between Past and Present: “Alternative Heritage”’, in Justine Ashby and Andrew Higson (Eds) British Cinema, Past and Present, 2000.
 Belén Vidal, Heritage Film: Nation, Genre and Representation, 2012.
 Eckart Voigts-Virchow (Ed.), Janespotting and Beyond: British Heritage Retrovisions since the Mid-1990s, 2004.
 Tana Wollen, ‘Over Our Shoulders: Nostalgic Screen Fictions for the 1980s’, in John Corner and Sylvia Harvey (Eds) Enterprise and Heritage: Crosscurrents of National Culture, 1991.
 Patrick Wright, On Living in an Old Country: The National Past in Contemporary Britain, 1985.

References

Film genres